The rosy tetra (Hyphessobrycon rosaceus) is a small species of Characin from the South American countries of Guyana and Brazil.It is popular in the aquarium trade.

Description
The rosy tetra has a light pink-white body with red fins, except the dorsal fin which can be black or white, and the caudal fin which is pink-white with two elliptical red spots on it. It has a faint black line from the top of its eyeball through the pupil, to the bottom of the eyeball. Like many other tetras, the males have longer dorsal fins than the females.

Distribution
In the wild, the rosy tetra lives in the Essequibo, Corantijn and Suriname River basins in South America.

Reproduction
The rosy tetra is an egg scattering school spawning fish in the wild. 100 eggs can be laid by one female, usually in the early morning, and over fine leaved plants.

References

External links
 Picture: http://animal-world.com/encyclo/fresh/characins/RosyTetra.php
 Rosy Tetra Fact Sheet
 http://www.fishforums.net/index.php?/topic/129970-rosy-tetra/

Tetras
Tropical fish
Characidae
Fishkeeping
Taxa named by Marion Durbin Ellis
Fish described in 1909